The Monist: An International Quarterly Journal of General Philosophical Inquiry is a quarterly peer-reviewed academic journal in the field of philosophy. It was established in October 1890 by American publisher Edward C. Hegeler.

History
Initially the journal published papers not only by philosophers but also by prominent scientists and mathematicians such as Ernst Mach, David Hilbert, Henri Poincaré, Alfred Binet, Pierre Janet, Cesare Lombroso and Ernst Haeckel. The journal helped to professionalize philosophy as an academic discipline in the United States by publishing philosophers such as Charles Sanders Peirce, Ernst Cassirer, John Dewey, Gottlob Frege, Hans-Georg Gadamer, Sidney Hook, C. I. Lewis, Hilary Putnam, Willard Van Orman Quine, and Bertrand Russell. Russell's Philosophy of Logical Atomism was originally published in fall as a series of articles in the journal in 1918–19. 

After ceasing publication in 1936, the journal resumed publication in 1962 and has been continually published since then. Each issue contains papers on a single, pre-announced topic. A list of topics thus far is provided here.

The journal's editors-in-chief have included Paul Carus (1890–1919), Mary Hegeler Carus (1919–1936), Eugene Freeman (1962–1983), John Hospers (1983–1991), Barry Smith (University at Buffalo, 1992–2016), Fraser MacBride (University of Manchester, 2017–present). Since January 2015 the journal has been published by Oxford University Press on behalf of the Hegeler Institute.

Abstracting and indexing
The journal is abstracted and indexed:

See also
 List of philosophy journals
 Mind

References

External links
 

English-language journals
Philosophy journals
Quarterly journals
Publications established in 1890
Contemporary philosophical literature
Publications disestablished in 1936
Publications established in 1962
Philosophy Documentation Center academic journals